Synchlora tenuimargo, Warren's bordered emerald, is a moth in the family Geometridae. It is found from Mexico to Peru. The habitat consists of cloudforests at elevations ranging from 400 to 2,000 meters.

Subspecies
Synchlora tenuimargo tenuimargo
Synchlora tenuimargo lineimargo (Prout, 1932)

References

Moths described in 1905
Synchlorini